The 2000–01 Armenian Hockey League season was the first season of the Armenian Hockey League, the top level of ice hockey in Armenia. Three teams participated in the league, and ASC Yerevan won the championship.

Regular season

Final
ASC Yerevan - Shengavit Yerevan (5-3, 3-1, 4-2)

Armenian Hockey League
2000 in Armenian sport
2001 in Armenian sport
Armenian Hockey League seasons